Sibon merendonensis is a species of colubrid snakes. The species is endemic to Sierra del Merendón in Guatemala.

References

Colubrids
Reptiles described in 2012
Snakes of Central America
Reptiles of Guatemala
Endemic fauna of Guatemala